Zacharia Francois de Bruin (born  in Ficksburg, South Africa) started his coaching career with Durban North College previously known as Afrikaans Hoër Durban-Noord and is a South African rugby union coach, currently the head coach of the  Super Rugby side and a consultant to the South Africa national team.

Career

Sharks

De Bruin started his coaching career in Durban at the  Academy.

Griquas, South Africa Under-21

He coached the side between 1998 and 2003, helping them reach the final of the competition in 1999 and 2000.

In 2001, De Bruin was also in charge of the South Africa Under-21 team.

Return to Sharks

He returned to Durban in 2004 to join as the head and skills coach of the Sharks Academy, helping out at Vodacom Cup, Under-21 and Under-19 level.

Lions

After eight seasons back in Durban, De Bruin moved to Johannesburg to become  and  head coach Johan Ackermann's assistant coach. In 2015, they improved even further, securing a record nine victories during the tournament and finishing in the top half of the log for the first time since 2001. After Ackermann accepted the head coaching job at English side Gloucester, de Bruin was named as his replacement from 2018 onwards.

In 2015, the Golden Lions went unbeaten through the Currie Cup to win it, beating Western Province in the final in Johannesburg. In 2016 and 2017 the Golden Lions were losing Semi-Finalists in the Currie Cup.

References

Living people
1960 births
People from Ficksburg
South African rugby union coaches